Gnorimoschema valesiella is a moth in the family Gelechiidae. It was described by Staudinger in 1877. It is found in Iceland, Spain, France, Austria, Switzerland, Italy, Norway, Sweden, Finland, Latvia, northern Russia, the Caucasus, Transbaikal, Greenland and Yukon.

The wingspan is 13–14 mm.

The larvae feed on Solidago virgaurea and Erigeron acer.

References

Gnorimoschema
Moths described in 1877